Mount Kent Observatory near Toowoomba, in the Darling Downs region of Queensland, Australia, is an observatory owned and operated by the University of Southern Queensland (USQ). It is the only professional astronomical research observatory in the state of Queensland. Mount Kent hosts the four MINERVA-Australis exoplanet-finding telescopes, three SONG telescopes for asteroseismology and stellar astrophysics, two 'Shared Skies' telescopes, and a USQ-Louisville telescope.

It is also used for teaching USQ students, and is part of a 'Shared Skies Partnership' with the University of Louisville's Moore Observatory, Kentucky.

History
In the 1980s a dark sky site was established at Mount Kent and used for teaching purposes by USQ. By 2009 the facilities had grown to include three telescopes: the Webb, O'Mara, and Louisville telescopes.

The observatory was significantly expanded beginning in 2016 with the establishment of MINERVA-Australis, funded by USQ, the Federal Government, the Australian Research Council, the University of New South Wales and the University of Sydney. It was opened by Minister for Industry, Science and Technology Karen Andrews and USQ Vice-Chancellor Professor Geraldine Mackenzie in March 2019.

The asteroid 11927 Mount Kent, which was discovered in 1993, is named after the observatory.

Telescopes
 MINERVA-Australis is an array of four  telescopes and a radial-velocity spectrograph for exoplanet science, established beginning in 2018. It is primarily used for ground-based observational follow-up for the NASA Transiting Exoplanet Survey Satellite (TESS). The telescope is operated by USQ and funded by the Australian Research Council and a consortium of research-intensive universities in Australia and overseas. 
 SONG - the Stellar Oscillations Network Group - has a high resolution spectrograph fed by two  telescopes, used primarily for asteroseismology and stellar physics. It is part of a network with telescopes in Tenerife and China.
 The Webb Telescope is a  Meade LX200 telescope in a  fibreglass dome. It is used for student field nights.
 The O’Mara Telescope is named after the late Mt Kent Observatory pioneer Dr Jim O’Mara (of the University of Queensland). It is a robotic telescope with  Meade optics and a CCD camera, and is housed in an octagonal enclosure designed by Jim O’Mara. It automatically serves remote imaging requests from USQ students.
 The Louisville Telescope has  Planewave Instruments CDK-20 optics as part of the Shared Skies Partnership with the University of Louisville. It is set up for live remote observing.
 The FUT (SONG) Telescope has  Planewave Instruments CDK-600 optics used as a research and outreach telescope by the Aarhus University and the SONG team.
 The USQ-Louisville Telescope has  Planewave Instruments RC-12.5 optics as a teaching and research robotic photometry telescope.

Discoveries
MINERVA-Australis was used in the discovery of TOI-257b, a rare 'sub-Saturn' planet lying between super-Earths and giant planets.

See also
Australian Astronomical Observatory (AAO)
University of Southern Queensland (USQ)
List of astronomical observatories
Lists of telescopes

References

External links
 

University of Southern Queensland
Astronomical observatories in Queensland
Science and technology in Queensland
Buildings and structures in Queensland